Elections were held to elect the New York City Board of Aldermen on November 5, 1929, in concert with other such contests as the Mayor, the Comptroller, the President of the Board of Aldermen, Borough presidents, County Sheriffs, and other miscellaneous questions. 

Democrats won a majority of 61 seats while Republicans won 4 seats, all in Manhattan. In addition to their victory in the Board Democrats won resounding victories in the other contests in what was considered "a Crushing Defeat to [the] City G.O.P. [delivered]" by Tammany Hall. Three incumbent Republican aldermen were defeated by Democrats.

A Communist Party candidate in the election named Fanny Austin was the first Black woman to run for city office in New York City.

Results by borough

Results by district

Manhattan (Districts 1–24)

District 1
Tammany incumbent Martin F. Tanahey was reelected, defeating Republican candidate Herman R. Hayunga and Socialist candidate Morris Goldowsky.

District 2
Incumbent Moritz Graubard defeated Republican candidate Harold H. Rothman and Socialist candidate Dominick Lodata to win reelection.

District 3
Incumbent Edward J. Sullivan defeated Republican candidate Jack Garbarino and Socialist candidate Ernest K. Harrsen to win reelection.

District 4
Incumbent Murray W. Stand defeated Republican candidate Sol Greenberg and Socialist candidate Samuel P. Ulanoff to win reelection.

District 5
Democratic candidate John J. Mahoney defeated Republican candidate Thomas R. Kearney and Socialist candidate Benjamin Blumenberg to win the election.

District 6
Democratic candidate Saul Fassler defeated Republican incumbent Frank J. Dotzler and Socialist candidate August Claessens. Dotzler also ran under the Square Deal Party banner and Communist Adolph Bassen also contested this seat.

District 7
Incumbent Walter F. Hagan defeated Republican candidate Lewis B. Freeman and Socialist candidate David Menin to win reelection.

District 8
Incumbent Louis J. Wronker defeated Republican candidate Joseph Marino and Socialist candidate Edward Levinson to win reelection. Communist Samuel Darcy also contested this seat.

District 9
Incumbent Dennis J. Mahon defeated Republican candidate Morton Baum and Socialist candidate Alexander Fichandler to win reelection.

District 10
Democratic candidate Harry R. Bell narrowly defeated Republican incumbent James A. Hatch by a plurality of 67 votes, also defeating Socialist candidate Eugenia I. Low.

District 11
Democratic incumbent Morton Moses defeated Republican candidate James W. Hyer and Socialist candidate Ephim H. Jeshurin to win reelection.

District 12
Democratic incumbent John J. Barrett defeated Republican candidate Adolph Hartschuh and Socialist candidate Barnet Fenster to win reelection.

District 13
Democratic incumbent Patrick S. Dowd defeated Republican candidate Frank C. Erb and Socialist candidate Morris Caspe to win reelection.

District 14
Democratic incumbent James F. Carroll defeated Republican candidate Charles J. Bartunck and Socialist candidate George McMullen to win reelection.

District 15
Republican incumbent Joseph Clark Baldwin defeated Democratic candidate Thomas M. Russell and Socialist candidate McAlister Coleman to win reelection.

District 16
Democratic incumbent Edward Cassidy defeated Republican candidate John Stamp and Socialist candidate Bruno Wagner to win reelection.

District 17
Democratic incumbent William Solomon defeated Republican candidate Irving Levy and Socialist candidate Bernard Schub to win reelection. Communist Libertad Narvaez also contested this seat.

District 18
Democratic candidate Timothy J. Sullivan defeated Republican candidate Morris Cohen and Socialist candidate Nathan Zughaft.

District 19
Republican incumbent Fred R. Moore defeated Democratic candidate Edward F. Kelly and Socialist candidate Max Kleinberg to win reelection.

District 20
Republican candidate Frank A. Manzella defeated Democratic incumbent Edward T. Kellyand Socialist candidate Otto West to win reelection. Communist Gaetano DiFazio also contested this seat.

District 21
Republican incumbent John C. Hawkins defeated Democratic candidate William H. Austin and Socialist candidate Ethelred Brown to win reelection. Communist Fanny Austin also contested this seat, as did Citizens' Committee of Harlem candidate E. Hortense Warner.

District 22
Democratic incumbent John B. Henrich defeated Republican candidate James B. McEvoy and Socialist candidate George F. Meyer to win reelection.

District 23
Democratic incumbent Joseph R. Smith defeated Republican candidate Alexander C. Woodward and Socialist candidate Fred Hodgson to win reelection.

District 24
Democratic incumbent Charles J. McGillick defeated Republican candidate Matthew W. Hughes and Socialist candidate Benjamin Kaufman to win reelection.

The Bronx (Districts 25–32)

District 25
Democratic incumbent Curley was reelected, defeating Republican candidate Adler and Socialist candidate Gross.

District 26
Democratic incumbent McDonald was reelected, defeating Republican candidate Lunney and Socialist candidate Wisotsky.

District 27
Democratic incumbent Hanley was reelected, defeating Republican candidate Wurster and Socialist candidate Wechler.

District 28
Democratic incumbent Sullivan was reelected, defeating Republican candidate Preyss and Socialist candidate Marshall.

District 29
Democratic incumbent Donovan was reelected, defeating Republican candidate Kirschner and Socialist candidate Conan.

District 30
Democratic candidate Kinsley defeated Republican candidate Ruffolo and Socialist candidate Painken to win the election.

District 31
Democratic incumbent M. Gross was reelected, defeating Republican candidate H.L. Gross and Socialist candidate Fassberg.

District 32
Democratic incumbent Alford J. Williams was reelected, defeating Republican candidate Hale and Socialist candidate Deutsch.

Brooklyn (Districts 33–56)

District 33
Democratic incumbent Patrick J. McCann defeated Republican candidate Lewis and Socialist candidate Belsky to win reelection.

District 34
Democratic incumbent McGarry defeated Republican candidate Amadel and Socialist candidate Schachner to win reelection.

District 35
Democratic incumbent Dermody defeated Republican candidate Giffone and Socialist candidate Nemser to win reelection.

District 36
Democratic incumbent Cunningham defeated Republican candidate Wolters and Socialist candidate Kritzer to win reelection.

District 37
Democratic incumbent Molen defeated Republican candidate Printzlien and Socialist candidate Rosen to win reelection.

District 38
Democratic incumbent O'Reilly defeated Republican candidate Reilly and Socialist candidate Rubinson to win reelection.

District 39
Democratic candidate Ryan defeated Republican candidate Sachter and Socialist candidate Tuvin.

District 40
Democratic candidate Richard J. Tonry defeated Republican candidate McPartland and Socialist candidate Cummings.

District 41
Democratic incumbent Kiernan defeated Republican candidate Isnardi and Socialist candidate Block to win reelection.

District 42
Democratic incumbent Weber defeated Republican candidate Surpless and Socialist candidate Weisberg to win reelection.

District 43
Democratic incumbent Campbell defeated Republican candidate Feldman and Socialist candidate Wolfe to win reelection.

District 44
Democratic incumbent Sahner defeated Republican candidate Klein and Socialist candidate Breckenridge to win reelection.

District 45
Democratic incumbent Allen defeated Republican candidate Stewart and Socialist candidate Kurinsky to win reelection.

District 46
Democratic incumbent Fenn defeated Republican candidate Skelton and Socialist candidate Smith to win reelection.

District 47
Democratic incumbent Hartung defeated Republican candidate Devitt and Socialist candidate Laider to win reelection.

District 48
Democratic incumbent John Cashmore defeated Republican candidate Wirth and Socialist candidate Sarasohn to win reelection.

District 49
Democratic incumbent Reich defeated Republican candidate Mayers and Socialist candidate Chatcuff to win reelection.

District 50
Democratic incumbent Hart defeated Republican candidate Ricca and Socialist candidate Sadoff to win reelection.

District 51
Democratic incumbent McCusker defeated Republican candidate Zito and Socialist candidate Morris to win reelection.

District 52
Democratic incumbent McGuinness defeated Republican candidate Campbell and Socialist candidate Babetskye to win reelection.

District 53
Democratic incumbent Hilkemeier defeated Republican candidate Moehringer and Socialist candidate Mailman to win reelection.

District 54
Democratic incumbent Rudd defeated Republican candidate Lachman and Socialist candidate Dann to win reelection.

District 55
Democratic incumbent Ott defeated Republican candidate Greene and Socialist candidate Epstein to win reelection.

District 56
Democratic incumbent Morris defeated Republican candidate Hower and Socialist candidate Breslow to win reelection.

Queens (Districts 57–62)

District 57
Democratic incumbent Lenihan was reelected, defeating Republican candidate Austin and Socialist candidate Herman.

District 58
Democratic candidate O'Connell defeated Republican candidate Schuler and Socialist candidate Schoenbaum.

District 59
Democratic candidate Gallagher defeated Republican incumbent Buss and Socialist candidate Magerlin.

District 60
Democratic candidate Posthauer defeated Republican candidate MacDevitt and Socialist candidate Cherkas.

District 61
Democratic incumbent Schwab was reelected, defeating Republican candidate Roeding and Socialist candidate Stanley.

District 62
Democratic candidate Deutschmann defeated Republican candidate Timms and Socialist candidate Smith.

Richmond (Districts 63–65)

District 63
Democratic incumbent Corcoran was reelected, defeating Republican candidate Roach and Socialist candidate Ferwerda.

District 64
Democratic incumbent Kaltenmeier was reelected, defeating Republican candidate Volkhardt and Socialist candidate Mattson.

District 65
Democratic incumbent Dalton was reelected, defeating Republican candidate Winant and Socialist candidate Airola.

Notes

References

New York City aldermanic election
New York City aldermanic election
Aldermanic election
New York City Council elections
New York City aldermanic election